(German for 'imperial penny') may refer to:

 , a 1/100 of a Reichsmark, the currency of the German Empire from 1924 to 1948